Rowland Sidnam Walter "Clinker" Birt (9 August 1890 – 5 June 1948) was a rugby union player who represented Australia.

Birt, a number eight, was born in Glasgow and claimed one international rugby cap for Australia.

References

Australian rugby union players
Australia international rugby union players
1890 births
1948 deaths
Rugby union players from Glasgow
Rugby union number eights